John Fisher (born 29 July) is a Scottish opera director, conductor, opera manager, vocal coach, and record producer. The former Artistic Administrator of La Scala in Milan, he served as the Chief Executive and Artistic Director of the Welsh National Opera (WNO) from 2006 until 2011. He has worked as a record producer of opera recordings for both Deutsche Grammophon and Decca Records, and collaborated with opera director Jean-Pierre Ponnelle on several opera films for Unitel Films.

Life and career
Born in Glasgow, Fisher is a graduate of the London Opera Centre, the Royal Academy of Music, and the University of Glasgow. In 1972 he joined the staff of the WNO as Music Director of "Opera For All", a program dedicated to making opera more accessible to modern audiences. From 1973-1975 he worked as a repetiteur, vocal coach, and Music Director of the Opera Studio at La Monnaie in Brussels. He then worked on the music staff at the De Nederlandse Opera in Amerstdam from 1975-1977. 
  
In 1977 Fisher was appointed the Head of Music Staff at La Scala in Milan. From 1981-1988 be served as La Scala's Artistic Administrator, and from 1983–1988 he worked as a consultant for the Rossini Opera Festival in Pesaro. In 1989 he became the first non-Italian to serve as Artistic Director of La Fenice in Venice. He left that post in 1994 to join the staff of Deutsche Grammophon as an Executive Producer and Director of Opera and Vocal Productions. He remained in that post until 1997 when he was hired by the Metropolitan Opera of New York City as the company's Director of Music Administration, a position he remained in until becoming General Director of the WNO in 2006.

Fisher served as jury chairman (operatic and song categories) of the prestigious 'BBC Cardiff Singer of the World' competition in 2007, 2009 and 2011. In 2011, 2012, 2013 and 2014 he served as an international guest coach on the faculty of the inaugural Lisa Gasteen Opera Summer School, and in 2012 he was invited back to the Met in NY to play a key role in the musical preparation of Wagner's Ring Cycle, working with - amongst others - acclaimed stars Bryn Terfel and Deborah Voigt. He is in demand throughout the world as an operatic vocal coach of the highest calibre, appearing at such institutions as the Juilliard School and the Young Artists Program at the Met.

On 5 July 2013, John Fisher was invested with an Honorary Fellowship of the Royal Welsh College of Music and Drama. On 24 August 2014, he conducted the Kaunas City Symphony Orchestra and State Choir in a performance of the Verdi Requiem for the closing concert of the Pažaislis Music Festival 2014 (Kaunas, Lithuania), commemorating the 70th anniversary of the liquidation of the Jewish ghetto in Kaunas.

In June, 2015, Fisher was a member of the jury for the 15th Tchaikovsky International Competition (Voice Category) in Moscow and St. Petersburg.

In September, 2015, Fisher returned to the Met as its Director of Music Administration and in 2016 became Assistant General Manager of Music Administration.

Recordings

References

1950 births
Living people
Alumni of the Royal Academy of Music
Alumni of the University of Glasgow
British opera directors
Opera managers
Metropolitan Opera people
Scottish conductors (music)
British male conductors (music)
Scottish directors
21st-century British conductors (music)
21st-century British male musicians